Nikola Matas (born 22 June 1987) is a Croatian football defender.

Club career
Nikola Matas went up through the ranks of his hometown's NK Junak Sinj academy, spending half a season in NK Zagreb, aged 18. He returned, however to Junak for his first senior season. He joined the newly promoted Druga HNL team, featuring in both their seasons at that rank, before returning to his home team, for another season in Croatia's second tier. Leaving the club again in the summer of 2010, he went on to spend 2 seasons in the Treća HNL Jug, playing for nearby NK Hrvace and NK Uskok.

This was followed by yet another return to Junak and the Druga HNL. Despite the club's relegation at the end of the season, his performances drew interest from Prva HNL sides, and he signed a 4-year contract with NK Lokomotiva.

He started off as the first choice at the right back position there, after the departure of Ivan Boras and the injury of Toni Gorupec. After the first seven rounds, however, he faded from the team and left the club at the winter break.

International career
Matas made his debut for Croatia in a January 2017 China Cup match against Chile and earned a total of 2 caps, scoring no goals. His second and final international was during the same tournament against China.

References

External links

1987 births
Living people
People from Sinj
Association football fullbacks
Croatian footballers
Croatia international footballers
NK Junak Sinj players
HNK Trogir players
NK Hrvace players
NK Uskok players
NK Lokomotiva Zagreb players
NK Osijek players
NK Istra 1961 players
NK Nafta Lendava players
NK Dugopolje players
First Football League (Croatia) players
Second Football League (Croatia) players
Croatian Football League players
Slovenian Second League players
Croatian expatriate footballers
Expatriate footballers in Slovenia
Croatian expatriate sportspeople in Slovenia